András Stark (born 27 November 1949) is a Hungarian weightlifter. He competed at the 1972 Summer Olympics and the 1976 Summer Olympics.

References

External links
 

1949 births
Living people
Hungarian male weightlifters
Olympic weightlifters of Hungary
Weightlifters at the 1972 Summer Olympics
Weightlifters at the 1976 Summer Olympics
Sportspeople from Komárom-Esztergom County
World Weightlifting Championships medalists